The 2013 Qatar Total Open was a professional women's tennis tournament played on hard courts. It was the 11th edition of the event and part of the WTA Premier 5 series of the 2013 WTA Tour. It took place at the International Tennis and Squash complex in Doha, Qatar between 11 and 17 February 2013.

Points and prize money

Point distribution

Prize money

* per team

Singles main-draw entrants

Seeds

1 Rankings as of February 4, 2013.

Other entrants
The following players received wildcards into the singles main draw:
 Fatma Al-Nabhani
 Heidi El Tabakh
 Ons Jabeur

The following players received entry from the qualifying draw:
 Ekaterina Bychkova
 Vera Dushevina
 Caroline Garcia
 Nadiia Kichenok
 Tadeja Majerič
 Bethanie Mattek-Sands
 Yulia Putintseva
 Anastasia Rodionova

The following player received entry as lucky loser:
 Daria Gavrilova
 Mervana Jugić-Salkić

Withdrawals
Before the tournament
 Li Na (left ankle injury)
 Dominika Cibulková 
 Bojana Jovanovski (back injury)

Retirements

 Maria Kirilenko (shoulder injury)
 Varvara Lepchenko (upper respiratory illness)
 Ekaterina Makarova (left hill injury)
 Yanina Wickmayer (low back injury)

Doubles main-draw entrants

Seeds

1 Rankings as of February 4, 2013.

Other entrants
The following pairs received wildcards into the doubles main draw:
  Fatma Al-Nabhani /  Kathrin Wörle
  Caroline Garcia /  Christina McHale
  Petra Kvitová /  Yanina Wickmayer
  Aleksandrina Naydenova /  Francesca Schiavone
The following pairs received entry as alternates:
  Maria Elena Camerin /  Simona Halep
  Justyna Jegiołka /  Veronika Kapshay
  Lyudmyla Kichenok /  Nadiia Kichenok

Withdrawals
Before the tournament
 Varvara Lepchenko (upper respiratory illness)
 Ekaterina Makarova (left hill injury)
 Yanina Wickmayer (low back injury)

Champions

Singles

 Victoria Azarenka def.  Serena Williams, 7–6(8–6), 2–6, 6–3

Doubles

 Sara Errani /  Roberta Vinci def.  Nadia Petrova /  Katarina Srebotnik, 2–6, 6–3, [10–6]

External links
Official Website

Qatar Total Open
Qatar Ladies Open
2013 in Qatari sport